Daire Plunkett (born 24 January 1990) is an Irish sportsperson.  He plays hurling with his local club St Brigid's and has been a member of the Dublin senior inter-county team since 2011.

References

Living people
1990 births
St Brigid's (Dublin) hurlers
Dublin inter-county hurlers
Sportspeople from Dublin (city)